Franciscan monastery or Franciscan friary may refer to a great number of locations, including:

 Franciscan Friary, Baja, in Baja, Hungary
 Franciscan Monastery (Graz), in Graz, Austria
 Franciscan Monastery in Kadaň, in Kadaň, Czech Republic 
 Mount St. Sepulchre Franciscan Monastery, in Washington, DC, United States
 Buttevant Franciscan Friary, Buttevant, Ireland
 Franciscan monastery of Široki Brijeg, in Široki Brijeg, Bosnia and Herzegovina

See also
 Order of Friars Minor Conventual
 :Category:Franciscan monasteries